New Opera House may refer to:

New Opera House (Auburn, Nebraska), listed on the National Register of Historic Places in Nemaha County, Nebraska
New Opera House (Charles Town, West Virginia), listed on the National Register of Historic Places in West Virginia
New Opera House, Melbourne, became the Tivoli Theatre in 1914